Graeme Butler is a heritage architect who has practiced in Melbourne, Australia for near to 40 years. He is principal of the heritage firm Graeme Butler & Associates, and author of many urban conservation and heritage studies and the authority on the Californian bungalow in Australia, which has been described as ...the quintessential work on the form.

Butler studied architecture at the University of Melbourne being one of only three who graduated (1972) with a major in history as well as the typical Design subject. The inclusion of architectural history was one result of the Melbourne Architecture School's broader curriculum, emanating in part from the student strikes at Melbourne University in the 1960s. Before and after graduating he worked for the following architectural firms: Rosman Hastings & Sorrel 1967, Burgess & Sprintz 1969, Bogle & Banfield 1972, and as a design assistant at Yuncken Freeman Architects (YFA)> 1972–1975. At Yuncken Freeman he worked as a design assistant on the interior fit-out of the Austin Hospital new ward block under the eccentric but brilliant Tony Woodhouse. 
He eventually took a lead design role on the completion of the Toorak Teachers College library and theatre building under YFA partner and confidant of Robin Boyd, Roy Simpson, whose instruction in approaching the design was: `Graeme ... give me some joy'. Joy or otherwise Graeme undertook the design in the current Miesian-influenced YFA house style as shown by their own once superb offices formerly at 411 King Street, Melbourne  (since largely destroyed) and BHP house. But instead of the matte black external finish of the YFA office and BHP he created the building in white, as a reference to the external colour of the adjoining Stonnington mansion,  built for John Wagner, a partner in Cobb and Co coaches. The design also included some internal two storey spaces and floating stairs, following the firm's preferred Ludwig Mies van der Rohe model. 
Butler then worked with McIntyre & McIntyre 1975–1976, on the pioneering recycling of the Henry Jones Jam Factory at Chapel street, Prahran, as a shopping centre cinema.  However his major architectural role was with the firm Perrott Lyon Timlock and Kesa, later Perrott Lyon Mathieson (1975-1981), as the project designer of the Museum Underground Railway Station fit-out (now Grand Central) and Melbourne Underground Loop Authority (MURLA) system graphics documentation,  initially under PLM associate David Simpson. 
The design of the Victorian Teachers Union offices in Camberwell for PLM under Brian Mathieson  was his last major architectural design work before taking a professional role in 1981 in the growing field of urban conservation. Before forming his own heritage consulting practice and still working for the architecture and planning firm Perrott Lyon Mathieson,  Butler completed one of the first heritage studies of the Melbourne Central Business District, undertaken for the newly created Historic Buildings Preservation Council, in the mid-1970s, and the City of Castlemaine Conservation Study.

Since, he has undertaken numerous other heritage studies in Victoria including many Melbourne suburbs as well as Geelong, Bendigo, and the Macedon Ranges.  He has been described as one of ...Australia’s most significant practitioners and researchers in heritage and conservation. 
He was the founding Secretary of the heritage professional group Council for the Historic Environment and later editor of the Council Journal  Historic Environment, which launched in 1980.

Publications
 
 

Official website
photostream

References

Conservation architects
C
Living people
University of Melbourne alumni
Year of birth missing (living people)